Beaman may refer to:

Beaman, Iowa, U.S.A.
Beaman, Missouri, U.S.A.
Beaman (cryptid)
Beaman (surname), English surname